Enrique Manuel Cruz (born November 21, 1981) is a former Dominican baseball player. He spent two seasons at the major league level, playing for the Milwaukee Brewers and the Cincinnati Reds. Cruz played his first professional season with their Rookie league GCL Mets. He last played in 2012 for the Kansas City T-Bones of the American Association of Independent Professional Baseball.

External links

1981 births
Living people
Chattanooga Lookouts players
Cincinnati Reds players
Dominican Republic expatriate baseball players in Canada
Dominican Republic expatriate baseball players in the United States
Edmonton Capitals players
El Paso Diablos players
Fargo-Moorhead RedHawks players
Frisco RoughRiders players
High Desert Mavericks players
Huntsville Stars players
Kansas City T-Bones players

Major League Baseball infielders
Major League Baseball players from the Dominican Republic
Milwaukee Brewers players
Nashville Sounds players
Rice Owls baseball players
Richmond Braves players
St. Lucie Mets players
York Revolution players